The South African Railways Class 8F 4-8-0 of 1904 was a steam locomotive from the pre-Union era in the Cape of Good Hope.

In 1904, the Cape Government Railways placed its final batch of ten 8th Class  Mastodon type steam locomotives in service. In 1912, when they were assimilated into the South African Railways, they were renumbered and designated Class 8F.

Manufacture

Evolution

The first 8th Class locomotive of the Cape Government Railways (CGR) was a  Consolidation type designed by H.M. Beatty, the CGR's Chief Locomotive Superintendent from 1896 to 1910. It was later to become the Class 8X on the South African Railways (SAR). While these first Schenectady- and ALCO-built  locomotives were being subjected to exhaustive testing on all types of traffic and under varying conditions, some trouble was experienced with the leading two-wheeled pony truck. When designs were prepared at Salt River for a later order for more locomotives, the pony truck was replaced with a four-wheeled bogie.

Builders
Orders for the last 8th Class locomotives for the CGR were placed with the North British Locomotive Company (NBL) in 1903. The ten locomotives were built and delivered in 1904, numbered in the range from 829 to 838 and allocated to the Western System of the CGR.

These ten locomotives were the final batch of CGR 8th Class locomotives to be built with a  Mastodon type wheel arrangement.

Class 8 sub-classes
When the Union of South Africa was established on 31 May 1910, the three Colonial government railways (CGR, Natal Government Railways and Central South African Railways) were united under a single administration to control and administer the railways, ports and harbours of the Union. Even though the South African Railways and Harbours came into existence in 1910, the actual classification and renumbering of all the rolling stock of the three constituent railways was only implemented with effect from 1 January 1912.

In 1912, these ten locomotives were renumbered in the range from 1234 to 1243 and designated Class 8F.

These locomotives, together with the rest of the CGR's 8th Class  Consolidations and  Mastodons and the Classes 8-L1 to 8-L3  Mastodon locomotives from the Central South African Railways (CSAR), were grouped into ten different sub-classes by the SAR. The  locomotives were designated SAR Classes 8 and 8A to 8F and the  locomotives were designated Classes 8X to 8Z.

Modification

During A.G. Watson's term as Chief Mechanical Engineer of the SAR from 1929 to 1936, many of the Classes 8 to 8F locomotives were equipped with superheated boilers, larger bore cylinders and either inside or outside admission piston valves.

Of the Class 8F locomotives, numbers 1236, 1242 and 1243 were equipped with superheated boilers,  bore cylinders and inside admission piston valves, and reclassified to Class 8FW.

Service
In SAR service, the  Class 8 family of locomotives worked on every system in the country and, in the 1920s, became the mainstay of motive power on many branchlines. Their final days were spent in shunting service. They were all withdrawn from service by 1972.

Preservation
Class 8FW no. 1236 is preserved and plithed at De Aar. It is the sole surviving Class 8F in South Africa.

Illustration

References

1580
1580
4-8-0 locomotives
2D locomotives
NBL locomotives
Cape gauge railway locomotives
Railway locomotives introduced in 1904
1904 in South Africa